The Joint Policy Board for Mathematics (JPBM) consists of the American Mathematical Society, the American Statistical Association, the Mathematical Association of America, and the Society for Industrial and Applied Mathematics. 

The Board has nearly 55,000 mathematicians and scientists who are members of the four organizations. 

Each April, the JPBM celebrates Mathematics and Statistics Awareness Month (previously, the month was called Mathematics Awareness Month) to increase public understanding of and appreciation for mathematics and statistics. The event was renamed by the JPBM in 2017. To simplify coordination efforts, the JPBM also decided in 2017 that there will no longer be an annual assigned theme for the month. This celebration of mathematics, and now mathematics and statistics, began as Mathematics Awareness Week in 1986.

JPBM Communications Award
Each January at the Joint Mathematics Meeting the JPBM gives its Communications Award to a journalist or other communicator for bringing accurate mathematical information to non-mathematical audiences.

JPBM Communications Award winners
2022: Talithia Williams
2021: John Bailer, Richard Campbell, Rosemary Pennington, and Erica Klarreich
2020: Christopher Budd and James Tanton
2019: Margot Lee Shetterly
2018: Vi Hart and Matt Parker
2017: Siobhan Roberts, for Expository and Popular Books, and Arthur T. Benjamin, for Public Outreach
2016: Simon Singh, for Expository and Popular Books, and the National Museum of Mathematics, for Public Outreach
2015: Nate Silver
 2014: Danica McKellar
 2013: John Allen Paulos
 2012: Dana Mackenzie
 2011: Nicolas Falacci and Cheryl Heuton
 2010: Marcus du Sautoy
 2009: George Csicsery
 2008: Carl Bialik
 2007: Steven H. Strogatz
 2006: Roger Penrose
 2005: Barry Arthur Cipra
 2003: Robert Osserman
 2002: Helaman Ferguson and Claire Ferguson
 2001: Keith J. Devlin
 2000: Sylvia Nasar
 1999: Ian Stewart
 1998: Constance Reid
 1997: Philip J. Davis
 1996: Gina Kolata
 1994: Martin Gardner
 1993: Joel Schneider
 1991: Ivars Peterson
 1990: Hugh Whitemore
 1988: James Gleick

External links

 JPBM 
 Mathematics and Statistics Awareness Month 
 MAA: JPBM Communications Award 

Mathematical societies